Flandria may refer to a number of things.

Club Social y Deportivo Flandria, an Argentine football team
, a Dutch merchant ship
Heinrich Isaac, a 15th-century composer, known as "Ugonis de Flandria"
Flandria (cycling team), cycling team active 1957–1979
The Latin name for Flanders (a county of Belgium). 
Another name for Boteka